Wangan Midnight is a 2007 Japanese anime television series based on Michiharu Kusunoki's award winning manga series of the same name. OB Planning (Initial D) announced the production of the animated series during the Tokyo Anime Fair in March 2007. Aired on a pay-per-view channel of Animax in June 2007, the series was co-produced by OB Planning, A.C.G.T., and Pastel under the direction of Tsuneo Tominaga and consists of twenty-six episodes. The series was released on DVD with the thirteenth volume reaching 29th on the Oricon sales chart for Japanese animation DVDs in November 2008. With 26 episodes, the series is split into four arcs. The first arc is the "Return of the Devil Z" arc, which focuses on Akio Asakura as he gets a rusty blue Nissan Fairlady Z (S30) after losing a race to a mysterious Porsche 911 driven by Tatsuya Shima, and dubbed "Blackbird". Nicknamed the "Devil Z" due to suffering from numerous accidents, Akio starts a rivalry with Blackbird for Wangan superiority, but tries to keep the car from crashing and also must deal with a young woman who is revealed to be the sister of the original owner of the Devil Z, who died in a crash while racing with Blackbird. Meanwhile, other racers are seeking to start a rivalry with the resurrected Devil Z and Blackbird such as Reina Akikawa, a fashion model and television host who drives a Nissan Skyline GT-R R32 and Yoshiaki Ishida, a photographer who drives a white Ferrari Testarossa. It also introduces Jun Kitami, the creator of the Devil Z and Blackbird who is now a bike shop owner. The "Perfect GT-R" arc focuses on Koichi Hiramoto, a young man who gave up on street racing to focus on his family, but comes out of retirement to face the Devil Z and Blackbird. Meanwhile, the Devil Z is destroyed after it crashes into a truck, but gets rebuilt and races again afterward. The "Monster Machine" arc focuses on Kei Aizawa, a host club worker and driver of the Toyota Supra who also seeks to defeat the Devil Z and Blackbird. The "R200 Club" arc focuses on a group of tuners who drive Nissan Skyline GT-R R33 cars that seek to outrun the Devil Z and Blackbird, alongside Reina's R32. Following this, Takayuki Kuroki, owner of FLAT racing and a former R200 Club before their disbandment, is also seeking to outrun the Devil Z and Blackbird as well. "The Hanshin Circular Line" arc focuses on Eiji and Maki Kamiya, two half-brothers from Osaka who both drive Mitsubishi Lancer Evolutions, while the final arc "The Legendary FC" arc focuses on Koichi Kijima, a writer, car enthusiast, and TV show host who drives a Mazda RX7 FC3S and also seeks to oust the Devil Z and Blackbird. The arc missing from the series is the "Akasaka Straight" arc, that focused on Masaki.

Episode list

References 

Wangan Midnight